Verbascum epixanthinum, the yellow mullein, is a species of flowering plant in the family Scrophulariacee, native to Greece. Though perennial, it may be short-lived.

It has won the Royal Horticultural Society's Award of Garden Merit. It is hardy, but requires a sheltered position in full sun. It is also considered by the RHS to be a good plant to attract pollinators.

References

epixanthinum
Endemic flora of Greece
Plants described in 1846